Antiblemma rufinans, the live oak antiblemma, is a moth of the family Noctuidae. The species was first described by Achille Guenée in 1852. It is found in dry, sandy woodlands, barrens, and scrub forests of the southern Florida plain. It is also present in South America, Cuba and Jamaica.

The larvae feed on live oak species.

References

Catocalinae
Moths of North America
Moths of South America